The 2010 elections for the Illinois Senate was conducted on Tuesday, November 2, 2010. The 2010 primary election was conducted on Tuesday, February 2, 2010. State Senators elected this year sat for two year terms, all of which expired at the beginning of the next General Assembly.

Overview

Individual results

See also
Illinois House of Representatives elections, 2010
Illinois Senate

References

General Election 2010: Offices and Candidates from the Illinois State Board of Elections

External links
Illinois State Board of Elections
Illinois General Assembly - Illinois State Senate, 96th General Assembly

2010 Illinois elections
2010
Illinois Senate